Wang Huimin (born 11 November 1992 in Shandong) is a Chinese volleyball player.

Clubs
  Zhejiang New Century Tourism

References

1992 births
Living people
Chinese women's volleyball players
Volleyball players from Shandong
Wing spikers
21st-century Chinese women